The Iqaluit Public Transit system operated from July 2003 to January 2005 to provide public transportation in Iqaluit, Nunavut, Canada. Mounting costs and low ridership forced city council to cancel the service in late 2004 and it ceased operations in January 2005.

History
Iqaluit previously operated bus services in the 1980s, and again during the Arctic Winter Games.

After paying approximately $137,000 for the service, the city had concluded that if they were to give taxi vouchers to every resident they would save almost $100,000 annually. Iqaluit had a 5-year contract with the R.L. Hanson Construction company to operate the service.

The topic of providing bus service in Iqaluit was considered again in December 2010, when city council members discussed it.

Fleet
 1 Ford B700 school bus - rented from R.L. Hanson

References

Transport in Iqaluit
Transit agencies in Canada